The first Kurdish newspaper titled Kurdistan, was published in Cairo in 1898. Since then tens of different Kurdish newspapers, magazines and journals have been published in Ottoman Empire, Iraq, Armenia, Syria, Lebanon and Iran and in recent years in Turkey, Germany, Sweden and France. The following is a list of well-known Kurdish newspapers and magazines in chronological order.

Kurdistan, Newspaper, Cairo/Geneva, First issue in 1898, 31 issues in total.
Roja Kurd, Monthly Journal, Istanbul, 1912, 3 issues.
Pêşkewtin, Newspaper, Sulaimania, 1920–1922, 118 issues.
Rojî Kurdistan, Newspaper, Sulaimania, 1922–1923, 15 issues.
Bangê Kurdistan, Weekly magazine, Sulaimania, 1922, 14 issues.
Bangê Heq, Weekly magazine, Sulaimania, 1923, 3 issues.
Umîdî Istiqlal, Weekly magazine, Sulaimnia, 1923, 25 issues.
Diyarî Kurdistan, Monthly Journal, Sulaimania, 1925–1926, 16 issues.
Jiyanewe, Weekly magazine, Sulaimania, 1924–1926, 56 issues.
Jiyan, Weekly magazine, Sulaimania, 1926–1938, 556 issues.
Zarî Kurmancî, Bimonthly Journal, Rawanduz, 1926–1932, 30 issues.
Riya Taze, Biweekly magazine, Yerevan, 1930–1938, 612 issues (in Latin characters).
Hawar, Monthly Journal, Damascus, 1932–1935 and 1941–1943, 57 issues.
Ziban, Weekly magazine, Sulaimania, 1937–1939, 70 issues.
Jîn, Weekly magazine, Sulaimania, 1939–1963, more than 1000 issues.
Gelawêj, Monthly Journal, Baghdad, 1939-1949.
Ronahî, Bimonthly Journal, Damascus, 1941–1945, 28 issues.
Roja Nû, Weekly magazine, Beirut, 1943–1946, 73 issues.
Kurdistan, Newspaper, Mahabad, 1945–1946, 113 issues.
Kurdistan, Monthly Literary Review, Mahabad, 1945–1946, 16 issues.
Stêr, Weekly magazine, Beirut, 1946, 3 issues.
Nizar, Monthly Journal, Baghdad, 1948–1949, 22 issues.
Hetaw, Biweekly magazine, Erbil, 1954–1960, 188 issues.
Riya Taze, Biweekly magazine, Yerevan, 1955-, more than 2,500 issues (in Cyrillic and Latin characters).
Hîwa, Bimonthly Journal, Baghdad, 1957–1963, 36 issues.
Ray Gel, Monthly Journal, Kirkuk, 1959–1962, 34 issues.
Azadî, Biweekly magazine, Kirkuk, 1959–1961, 56 issues.
Bilêse, Monthly Journal, Sulaimania, 1959–1960, 10 issues.
Xebat, Newspaper, Baghdad, 1959–1961, 462 issues.
Kurdistan, Weekly magazine, Tehran, 1959–1963, 205 issues (only circulated outside Iran).
Rojî Nwê, Biweekly magazine, Sulaimania, 1960, 18 issues.
Birwa, Weekly magazine, Sulaimania, 1960–1963, 95 issues.
Hewlêr, Weekly magazine, Erbil, 1962–1963, 76 issues.
Dicle û Firat, Monthly Journal, Istanbul, 1962–1963, 8 issues.
Dengê Taze, Monthly Journal, Istanbul, 1966, 4 issues.
Birayetî, Monthly Journal, Baghdad, 1970–1971, 18 issues.
Birayetî, Monthly Journal, Sulaimania, 1971–1972, 18 issues.
Azadiya Welat
Hawlati, Biweekly magazine, Sulaimania, 2000-
Awena, Weekly magazine, Sulaimania, 2006-
The Kurdish Review, monthly newspaper, Washington, D.C 2011–Present

External links
The Kurdish Review, The only Kurdish-American newspaper in print, based in Washington, D.C.
[ T. Bois, The Kurdish Press], In Kurds and Kurdistan, Encyclopaedia of Islam.
Kurdish Cultural Magazines, Kurdish Library, Sweden.

Kurdish-language mass media
Press